Redskin is a 1929 American film with a synchronized score and sound effects, filmed partially in Technicolor. Its final six minutes were shown in Magnascope, an enlarged-screen projection novelty. The film, directed by Victor Schertzinger, stars Richard Dix and was produced and released by Paramount Famous Lasky Corp. Though not well remembered among the general public, the film is regarded highly by film historians for presenting sympathetic portrayals of Native Americans in the silent film era.

Plot
After years of attending preparatory school and college in the Eastern United States, Wing Foot (Richard Dix), who after graduating finds out that he is an outcast in an overwhelmingly white society because of his race, returns to his Navajo tribe and renounces their customs and beliefs, becoming an outcast among his own people. He later secretly visits the village of a rival tribe in order to see Corn Blossom (Julie Carter), his sweetheart, who has also been to school in the East. Her people discover his presence, and he is forced to flee into the desert, where he discovers oil. White prospectors also find the oil, and Wing Foot races them to the claim office, filing his claim first. Faced with marriage to a man she does not love, Corn Blossom takes refuge in the Navajo village. Her people come to take her back, and a pitched battle between the tribes is averted only when Wing Foot arrives and tells both tribes of the new good fortune of the Indian nations. He then claims Corn Blossom as his own.

Cast
 Richard Dix as Wing Foot
 Julie Carter as Corn Blossom
 Jane Novak as Judith Stearns
 Larry Steers as John Walton
 Tully Marshall as Navajo Jim
 Bernard Siegel as Chahi
 George Regas as Chief Notani
 Augustina López as Grandmother Yina
 Noble Johnson as Pueblo Jim
 Joseph W. Girard as Commissioner
 Jack Duane as Barrett
 Andrew J. Callaghan as Anderson
 Myra Kinch as Laughing Singer
 Philip Anderson as Wing Foot, age 9
 Lorraine Rivero as Corn Blossom, 6
 George Walker as Pueblo Jim, age 15

Source:

Production
Technicolor was used for the scenes taking place on the Indians' land, while black-and-white (sepia-toned in the original projection prints) was used for the scenes set in the white man's world. Roughly three-fourths of the film is in color.  Location shooting took place in Canyon de Chelly.

Home video
Redskin is currently available in the United States on disc 4 of the DVD collection Treasures III: Social Issues in American Film, 1900-1934.

See also
 List of early color feature films
 The Vanishing American (1925)

References

External links 
 
 
 

1929 films
1920s color films
Films about Native Americans
American silent feature films
Transitional sound films
Paramount Pictures films
Films directed by Victor Schertzinger
Silent films in color
Early sound films
Early color films
1920s English-language films
1920s American films